Brooklyn is a city in Poweshiek County, Iowa, United States. The population was 1,502 at the 2020 census. It is located just off U.S. Route 6 and a few miles north of Interstate 80. Near the center of town, Brooklyn boasts a large display of flags from each of the fifty states, branches of the military, and a smattering of other sources. The city bills itself as "Brooklyn: Community of Flags."

Geography
Brooklyn is located at  (41.732093, −92.443531).

Demographics

2010 census
As of the census of 2010, there were 1,468 people, 615 households, and 370 families residing in the city. The racial makeup of the city was 95.1% White, 0.7% African American, 0.3% Asian, 2.9% from other races, and 1.0% from two or more races. Hispanic or Latino of any race were 4.0% of the population.

There were 615 households, of which 32.0% had children under the age of 18 living with them, 44.6% were married couples living together, 11.5% had a female householder with no husband present, 4.1% had a male householder with no wife present, and 39.8% were non-families. 33.5% of all households were made up of individuals, and 14.6% had someone living alone who was 65 years of age or older. The average household size was 2.31 and the average family size was 2.99.

The median age in the city was 36.2 years. 26.3% of residents were under the age of 18; 8.4% were between the ages of 18 and 24; 23.9% were from 25 to 44; 24.7% were from 45 to 64; and 16.6% were 65 years of age or older. The gender makeup of the city was 46.3% male and 53.7% female.

2000 census
As of the census of 2000, there were 1,367 people, 582 households, and 349 families residing in the city. The racial makeup of the city was 99.20% White, 0.07% Asian, 0.22% from other races, and 0.51% from two or more races. Hispanic or Latino of any race were 0.51% of the population.

There were 582 households, out of which 29.6% had children under the age of 18 living with them, 48.1% were married couples living together, 8.9% had a female householder with no husband present, and 39.9% were non-families. 36.8% of all households were made up of individuals, and 20.3% had someone living alone who was 65 years of age or older. The average household size was 2.25 and the average family size was 2.95.

24.5% were under the age of 18, 7.5% from 18 to 24, 26.5% from 25 to 44, 20.3% from 45 to 64, and 21.2% were 65 years of age or older. The median age was 40 years.  For every 100 females, there were 83.5 males. For every 100 females age 18 and over, there were 79.8 males.

The median income for a household in the city was $34,583, and the median income for a family was $44,531. Males had a median income of $29,018 versus $20,481 for females. The per capita income for the city was $18,315. About 2.9% of families and 6.2% of the population were below the poverty line, including 6.6% of those under age 18 and 7.5% of those age 65 or over.

Education
Brooklyn is part of the BGM Community School District, a primarily rural school district that also includes the communities of Guernsey and Malcom and surrounding areas. The main campus houses a single building that serves students from pre-kindergarten through 12th grade.

Healthcare
Brooklyn area residents have access to Brooklyn Medical Clinic, located at 128 Jackson St. When hospitalization is required the closest and most convenient hospital for residents is Grinnell Regional Medical Center, located at 210 4th Avenue in Grinnell, Iowa.

Media
Brooklyn is home to one radio station. KSKB Radio broadcasts on 99.1 FM as a Class C2 station and broadcasts and contemporary Christian music and teaching format. The station is locally programmed but owned by Florida Public Radio, Inc. which owns other stations in Iowa, Kansas, & Florida as well. KSKB is marketed towards the Cedar Rapids - Iowa City - Marshalltown - Pella region and is rebroadcast on K259AV 99.7 in Waterloo and KLOX 90.9 in Creston.

2008 Iowa caucus
During the Presidential caucus of 2008, Gersh Kuntzman, the editor of The Brooklyn Paper, a small New York City broadsheet journal, spent a week in Brooklyn, Iowa, posting daily reports on the city, its residents and the political process.

Notable people

Bruce Braley (born 1957), United States Congressman, grew up in Brooklyn.
Rollin Edelen (1908–1993), Iowa businessman and state legislator, was born in Brooklyn.
Walter E. Edelen (1911–1991), Iowa business and state legislator, was born in Brooklyn.
Bernard F. Meyer (1891–1975), Catholic missionary to China who served as Prefect Apostolic of Wuzhou, was born in Brooklyn.

References

External links

Official website 
 

Cities in Iowa
Cities in Poweshiek County, Iowa